Elections to Mole Valley Council were held on 7 May 1998.  One third of the council was up for election and the council stayed under no overall control.

After the election, the composition of the council was
Liberal Democrat 16
Conservative 14
Independent 9
Labour 2

Election result

References
"Council poll results", The Guardian 9 May 1998 page 16

1998
1998 English local elections
1990s in Surrey